"Sunshine" is a song by English singer Gabrielle. It was written by Gabrielle and Jonathan Shorten for her third album, Rise (1999). Released as the album's lead single, the song became her sixth top-10 hit on the UK Singles Chart, peaking at number nine.

In 2019, DJ Spoony together with Katie Chatburn and the Ignition Orchestra featuring Gabrielle recorded an orchestral version of the Wookie remix for the UK garage covers album Garage Classical. In September 2019, NME included the Wookie remix of "Sunshine" in their "25 essential UK garage anthems" list.

Track listings

Credits and personnel
Credits are lifted from the Rise album booklet.

Studios
 Produced at Trident Studios (London, England)
 Mixed at The Church (London, England)

Personnel

 Gabrielle – writing, vocals, backing vocals
 Jonathan Shorten – writing, keyboards, string arrangement, production
 Mary Pearce – backing vocals
 Linda Muriel – backing vocals
 Chris Ballin – backing vocals
 Chris Newton – backing vocals
 Paul Noble – bass, guitars
 Richie Fermie – drum programming, production
 London Session Orchestra – strings, brass
 Howard Gott – violin
 Lucy Wilkins – violin
 Everton K C Nelson – violin
 Sophie Sirota – violas
 Sarah Wilson – cello
 Jason Hazeley – string arrangement, brass arrangement
 John Brough – mixing

Charts

Certifications

References

1999 singles
1999 songs
Gabrielle (singer) songs
Go! Beat singles
Songs written by Gabrielle (singer)
Songs written by Jonathan Shorten